Drowning in the Sea of Love is the seventh studio album by the American singer Joe Simon, released in 1972 on the Spring Records label.

Chart performance
The album peaked at No. 11 on the R&B albums chart. It also reached No. 71 on the Billboard 200. The album features the title track, which peaked at No. 3 on the Hot Soul Singles chart and No. 11 on the Billboard Hot 100, "Pool of Bad Luck", which reached No. 13 on the Hot Soul Singles Chart and No. 42 on the Billboard Hot 100, and "I Found My Dad", which charted at No. 5 on the Hot Soul Singles chart and No. 50 on the Billboard Hot 100.

Track listing

Personnel
Roland Chambers, Norman Harris, T.J. Tindall – guitars
Ronnie Baker – bass
Earl Young – percussion
Larry Washington – conga, bongos
Vincent Montana Jr. – vibes
Leon Huff – piano, electric piano

Charts

Singles

References

External links
 

1972 albums
Joe Simon (musician) albums
Albums produced by Kenneth Gamble
Albums produced by Leon Huff
Albums arranged by Thom Bell
Albums arranged by Bobby Martin
Albums recorded at Sigma Sound Studios
Spring Records albums